Adam Wa Mishmish is an Arabic-language educational cartoon created in 2016. Initially published on YouTube, the series teaches literacy in Arabic, numeracy, and the elements of musical instruments such as the ney.

History
The program was founded by Luma Al Adnani in an effort to teach her son Adam the Arabic language. The other co-founders are Lina Al Adnani, COO & Music Lead, Ibrahim Taha, the music manager and Lutfi Zayed, the creative director.  In April 2016, Adam Wa Mishmish was created on the video sharing website YouTube to provide free educational entertainment to children who wanted to learn Arabic across the world.

In its early stages, Adam Wa Mishmish was self-funded. Later, seven episodes were funded through the Jordanian crowdfunding site Afkarmena.com.  Following the release of the first season of Adam Wa Mishmish on YouTube, the startup received funding from the Abdul Hameed Shoman Foundation, which helped produce the first 80 episodes, a play and a book series. In 2021, the startup raised $475,000 in a seed funding round led by Hadi Badi a Saudi Arabia-based news and review site.

References 

Reading and literacy television series
2010s preschool education television series
2020s preschool education television series
Animated preschool education television series
Arabic television series
Arabic-language YouTube channels
Education-related YouTube channels